Amudhavum Annalakshmiyum is a 2022 Indian Tamil-language soap opera starring Kanmani Manoharan and Rajashree, both are in the titular roles with Arun Padmanabhan. The series premiered on 4 July 2022, airs on Zee Tamil and streams on ZEE5 app.

Synopsis
Uneducated but  straightforward and determined "Amudha" wishes her marriage life to be only with a teacher, hoping that he would be able to help Amudha to achieve her dream of getting educated. Soon she come across "Senthil", a school teacher and she decides to marry him.

On the other hand "Annalakshmi", a well caring mother was proud of his son Senthil for his profession as a school teacher because she wants to restore her family's lost pride and made her son Senthil to become a teacher.

Here comes the twist that Senthil were not working has a teacher in the school, he works as a peon in a school while pretending to be a teacher in front of his family. Now how Amudha and Annalakshmi reacts the truth behind Senthil is the main plot.

Cast

Main
 Kanmani Manoharan as Amudha
 An enthusiastic and dynamic woman who  discontinued the education and take cares the family due to her mother's demise. So being an uneducated woman, she wants a teacher has a groom. She was Chithambaram's eldest daughter; Elango's youngest sister; Selva and Uma's eldest sister; Senthil's love interest 
 Rajashree as Annalakshmi
 She was a soft and sweet mother of Senthil, Paramu, Vadivel and Bhuvana. Her pride was his eldest son Senthil, as he full filled her dream to become a teacher. She also decided Senthil to be marry with Amudha
 Arun Padmanabhan as Senthil
 A responsible and respectable man and his mother Annalakshmi was his world. His family believed that he was a teacher in Government School but he hides the truth and works as clerk in that same school. He was Paramu's youngest brother; Vadivel and Bhuvana's eldest brother; He falls in love with Amudha at first sight.

Supporting
 Raj Kapoor as Manickam
 Annalashmi's brother; Senthil, Paramu, Vadivel and Bhuvana's maternal uncle
 Ravi Prakash as Chithambaram
 Amudha, Elango, Selva and Uma's father; Nagalakshmi's father-in-law
 Syamantha Kiran as Parameshwari (Paramu)
 Annalakshmi's eldest daughter; Chinna's wife; Senthil, Vadivel and Bhuvana's eldest sister
 Salma Arun as Nagalaskhmi (Naagu) 
 Chithambaram's daughter-in-law; Elango's wife; Amudha, Selva and Uma's eldest sister-in-law
 Anandha Krishnan as Elango
 Chithambaram's eldest son; Nagalaskhmi's husband; Amudha, Selva and Uma's eldest brother
 Munish Raja as Chinna
 Annalakshmi's son-in-law; Paramu's husband; Senthil, Vadivel and Bhuvana's eldest brother-in-law
 Sathya Raaja as Vadivel
 Annalakshmi's youngest son; Paramu and Senthil's youngest brother; Bhuvana's eldest brother
 Jeeva Rajendran / DJD Kenny as Selva
 Chithambaram's youngest son; Elango and Amudha's youngest brother; Uma's eldest brother
 Muthazhagi as Uma
 Palani's wife; Chithambaram's youngest daughter; Elango, Amudha and Selva's youngest sister
 Prabukuttimani as Palani 
 Uma's husband 
 Akshara as Bhuvana
 Annalakshmi's youngest daughter; Paramu, Senthil and Vadivel's youngest sister
 Sujatha Selvaraj as Shanthi
 Nagalakshmi's mother
 Vadivukkarasi as Nachiyar
 Chithambaram's mother; Amudha, Elango, Selva and Uma's grandmother

Production

Development
The series shoot began in January 2022 and the first promo was released on 9 February 2022 by revealing only half of the series title name Amudhavum _, with the main leads Kanmani Manoharan, known as Sweety (Bharathi Kannamma fame) and Arun Padmanabhan (Mangalya Dosham fame) where Amudha, one of the name of the title was played by Kanmani.

The promo creates longing among the audience for the full title name and the series is expected to be launch on March or April, but the team postponed and the shoot was halt, also no further announcements regarding the series launch and the promo was not telecasting on Zee Tamil TV for three months. This makes the rumors that the series was shelved and believed that it was dropped.

In May 2022, the shoot was began and filmed at Karaikudi. Finally the production team and the channel put an end to the rumors by releasing the second promo on 8 June 2022 with the additional cast members and revealing the full title name Amudhavum Annalakshmiyum, where Annalakshmi character was played by Karuthamma fame actress Rajashree. Within a week, the official launch date and timings was released. Sofia, was selected to play the role Nagalakshmi but she quit the series by making only the promo appearance, later she was replaced by Salma Arun. Likewise Blacksheep fame Shamni was signed to play the character Bhuvana, but she also left the series before the series launch by making only promo appearance, then Akshara replaced her in that role.

Promotion
Zee Tamil was promoted their new three fictions Maari, Meenakshi Ponnunga and including this series by making advertisement with popular film actress Sneha, Saranya Ponvannan and Sangeetha with the slogan Vanga Paarkalaam Ithu Namma Time and this promo released on 26 June 2022.

The Channel also arranged the press meet with the cast of the three fictions at Vadapalani, Chennai.

During Week 52 2022, it became No:2 Serial in 7:00PM Slot with excellent ratings.

References

External links
 
 Amudhavum Annalakshmiyum at ZEE5

Zee Tamil original programming
Tamil-language romance television series
Tamil-language television soap operas
2022 Tamil-language television series debuts
Television shows set in Tamil Nadu
Tamil-language television shows